29 Palms is a 2002 crime thriller film directed by Leonardo Ricagni and starring Jeremy Davies, Rachael Leigh Cook, Michael Lerner, Litefoot, Russell Means, Chris O'Donnell, Keith David, Michael Rapaport and Jon Polito. The film is about a bag of money that affects the characters who possess it, and its varied contents, as it passes from one to another.

In 2002 Eagle Pictures released the film under the Italian title La Grande Sfida (The Great Challenge) on DVD.

References

External links
 
 
 
 29 Palms at Filmcritic.com

2002 crime thriller films
2002 films
Films produced by John Davis
American crime thriller films
2000s English-language films
Films scored by Mario Grigorov
2000s American films